Stephanoberycidae, the pricklefishes are a family of fishes in the order Stephanoberyciformes.

They are found in tropical and subtropical waters of the Atlantic and Pacific Oceans, and to the Indian Ocean off the coast of South Africa.

It is thought that they are bathypelagic (deep ocean dwelling) or benthic (bottom dwelling) as they are known to eat crabs.

Their common name derives from the large spiny form of their scales in some species.

References 

Merrett, N. R. and J. A. Moore. 2005. A new genus and species of deep demersal fish (Teleostei: Stephanoberycidae) from the tropical eastern North Atlantic. Journal of Fish Biology 67:1699–1710.

 
Ray-finned fish families